Adrián Galád (born 1970) is a Slovak astronomer and a discoverer of minor planets.

He is credited by the Minor Planet Center with the discovery and co-discovery of 80 numbered minor planets between 1995 and 2004, most of them in collaboration with astronomers Dušan Kalmančok, Alexander Pravda, Juraj Tóth, Leonard Kornoš, Peter Kolény and Štefan Gajdoš.

The asteroid 32008 Adriángalád, a binary asteroid discovered by LINEAR, was named after him in 2016.

List of discovered minor planets

References 
 

1970 births
Slovak astronomers
Discoverers of asteroids

Living people